Romero is a surname of Spanish origin.

Romero may also refer to:

Places 
Romero Canyon, Arizona
Romero Rock, Antarctica

People 
Romero Lubambo (born 1955), Brazilian jazz guitarist
Romero Osby (born 1990), American basketball player for Maccabi Kiryat Gat of the Israeli Basketball Premier League
Romero Quimbo, Filipino politician and member of the Philippine House of Representatives
Romero Mendonça Sobrinho (born 1975), Brazilian football striker

Other uses 
Romero (film), a 1989 motion picture about assassinated Roman Catholic Bishop Óscar Romero
ARM Romero, a patrol vessel of the Mexican Navy
Trichostema lanatum, a shrub also called "romero" by Spanish explorers